Hugh Fay (June 9, 1882 – December 4, 1925) was an American comedic actor and director. He appeared in vaudeville and silent films.

He was the son of Irish vaudevillian Henry "Hugh" Fay and comedic actress Elfie Fay was his sister.

Filmography

Actor
Crooked to the End (1915)
A Hash House Fraud (1915) 
Mabel Lost and Won (1915) as the vamp's friend 
An Oily Scoundrel (1916)
Her Donkey Love (1917)
A Matrimonial Accident (1917)
Stars and Bars (1917)
Son of a Gun (1918)
Are Married Policemen Safe? (1918)
A Neighbor's Keyhole (1918)
The Failed Marriage (1918)
A Lady Bellhop's Secret (1919)
Better Times (1919) as Jack Ransom
Almost Married) (1919) as Manny Morrison
A Favor to a Friend (1919) as Danny Abbott 
 Please Get Married (1919) as Soapy Higgins
Hired and Fired (1920)
A Kick in the High Life (1920)
Little Annie Rooney (1925) as Spider
Spuds (1927) as Spy

Director
Won By a Foot (1917)
The Rainmaker (1922)
Glad Rags (1922)
It's a Gift (1923)
Tour Service (1926)

References

External links

 

1882 births
1925 deaths
Film directors from New York City
Vaudeville performers
American male silent film actors
20th-century American male actors
Male actors from New York City
Burials at Grand View Memorial Park Cemetery